Admiral Sir John Bush, KCWE, commonly known as Captain Bush and sometimes by his Thai title Phraya Wisuth Sakoradith (4 August 1819 – ), was an English sea captain who served under the Siamese government during the reigns of Kings Mongkut and Chulalongkorn. He came to Siam in early 1857 as a merchant ship captain and was engaged as Bangkok's Harbour Master the next year, captained royal vessels and managed the Bangkok Dock Company until his retirement in 1893. Soi Charoen Krung 30, the street where he used to live, is also known as Soi Captain Bush after him.

References

Sea captains
John Bush
English expatriates in Thailand
1819 births
1905 deaths
Burials at the Bangkok Protestant Cemetery